Skjold-class corvettes (skjold means "shield" in Norwegian) are a class of six light, superfast, stealth missile corvettes in service with the Royal Norwegian Navy. The boats were formerly classed as MTBs (motor torpedo boats) but, from 2009, the Royal Norwegian Navy has described them as corvettes (korvett) because their seaworthiness is seen as comparable to corvettes, and because they do not carry torpedoes. They were built at the Umoe Mandal yard.

Development and production

The Skjold-class vessels began with the development of the Royal Norwegian Navy's "Project SMP 6081", and the first preproduction version was ordered on 30 August 1996. The first ship of its class, P960, was launched on 22 September 1998 and commissioned 17 April 1999. A Norwegian Parliamentary White Paper of 2001 recommended building five additional boats, and this was agreed to in 2002. Six Skjold-class vessels replaced the Royal Norwegian Navy's previous fourteen s.

Design

The Skjold design is a surface effect craft, constructed of glass fibre/carbon composite materials. Buoyancy is augmented underway by a fan-blown skirted compartment between the two rigid catamaran-type hulls. This provides an alternative solution to the planing hull/vee hull compromise: the air cushion reduces wave slam at high speeds while presenting a low-drag flat planing profile at the waterline.

To ensure stealth capabilities, anechoic coatings of radar absorbent materials (RAM) have been used in the load-bearing structures over large areas of the ship. This strategy leads to significant weight saving compared to the conventional construction technique of applying RAM cladding to the external surfaces. The ship's profile has a faceted appearance with no right angle structures and few orientations of reflective panels. Doors and hatches are flush with the surfaces and the windows are flush without visible coaming (edge of window aperture) and are fitted with radar reflective screens. The vessels are additionally protected by the Rheinmetall MASS sensor / decoy system.

The final design was changed compared to the prototype Skjold, which itself was rebuilt to the new specifications. Most notably, the vessels use 4 gas turbines combined by Renk COGAG gear units built in a lightweight design. The smaller gas turbines rated 2,000 kW turbines are used for cruising speed. For sprint speed a second, larger gas turbine is combined providing a total of 6,000 kW to the waterjet on each shaft line. Two MTU 123 cruise diesel propulsion units used previously at loiter speeds were removed. The foredeck was strengthened to accommodate the addition of a 76 mm Otobreda Super Rapid gun.

The hull material was produced by a different method to improve strength and minimize vulnerability to fire. The bridge saw some changes, including an upgrade to six weapon systems control consoles.

In 2020, the Norwegian Government decided to further upgrade the Skjold-class vessels, partially to compensate for the loss of the frigate Helge Ingstad. The upgrades would take place between 2020 and 2024, permitting the Skjold-class to remain up-to-date through to 2030 when replacement vessels were envisaged under terms of the government's defence plan.

US Navy

The U.S. Navy and Coast Guard expressed interest in the design and leased the P960 for a period of one year, from 2001 until 2002. During that time it was operated by a 14-man Norwegian crew out of Naval Amphibious Base Little Creek.

Vessels

See also 
 List of ships of the Norwegian Navy

Similar ships
  (United Arab Emirates)
  (Finland)
 Steregushchiy-class corvette (Russia)
 Type 022 missile boat (People’s Republic of China)
 Milgem-class corvette (Turkey)
  (Greece)
  (Sweden)
  (Republic of China)

References

 Saunders, Stephen "Jane's Fighting Ships 2003–2004" .

External links

 Leo Lazauskas (2008) Performance characteristics of a 260t displacement SES. Dept. Applied Mathematics Report, The University of Adelaide, 19 February 2008.
 Norwegian Skjold class corvettes storm and steil in Plymouth Sound.  9 July 2015.

Missile boats of the Royal Norwegian Navy
Patrol vessels of Norway
Military catamarans
Stealth ships
Corvette classes
Patrol boat classes